Events from the year 1974 in France.

Incumbents
 President: 
 until 2 April: Georges Pompidou
 2 April-27 May: Alain Poher
 starting 27 May: Valéry Giscard d'Estaing
 Prime Minister: Pierre Messmer (until 27 May), Jacques Chirac (starting 27 May)

Events
1 March – Pierre Messmer finishes his first term as Prime Minister of France.
3 March – Turkish Airlines Flight 981 a McDonnell Douglas DC-10 crashes into the Ermenville Forest just outside Senlis killing all 346 on board.
8 March – Charles de Gaulle Airport opens in Paris.
2 April – President Georges Pompidou dies in office. Senate President Alain Poher becomes Acting President for the second time.
7 August – French acrobat Philippe Petit walks across a high wire slung between the twin towers of the World Trade Center in New York City.
28 August – The Citroen CX, top model in the Citroen range, is launched – succeeding the 19-year-old DS. It is voted European Car of the Year.
12 September – The crew of the  take over the ship off Le Havre in an unsuccessful attempt to prevent her withdrawal; she never sails under the French flag again. 
9 December – The Paris summit, reuniting the European communities' heads of state and government, commences.

Sport
27 June – Tour de France begins.
21 July – Tour de France ends, won by Eddy Merckx of Belgium.

Births

January to March
6 January – Romain Sardou, novelist.
13 January – Thierry Debès, soccer player.
16 January – Frédéric Dindeleux, soccer player.
20 January – Florian Maurice, soccer player.
21 January – Ulrich Le Pen, soccer player.
23 January – Bernard Diomède, soccer player.
3 February – Florian Rousseau, cyclist and Olympic gold medallist.
6 February – Sébastien Delagrange, golfer.
8 February – Guy-Manuel de Homem-Christo, musician.
10 February – Lionel Potillon, soccer player.
11 February – Sébastien Hinault, cyclist.
17 February – Frédéric Bolley, twice motocross world champion.
20 February – Ophélie Winter, singer and actress.
23 February – Stéphane Bernadis, figure skater.
26 February – Sébastien Loeb, rally driver and three time World Champion.
17 March – Franck Bouyer, cyclist.
21 March – Sébastien Gimenez, soccer player.
31 March – Patrick Regnault, soccer player.

April to June
1 April – Cyril Raffaelli, traceur, martial artist and stuntman.
7 April – Julien Boutter, tennis player.
11 April – Franck Rénier, cyclist.
18 April – Olivier Besancenot, politician.
29 April – Pascal Cygan, soccer player.
8 May – Raphaël Jacquelin, golfer.
9 May – Benoît Salmon, cyclist.
10 May – Sylvain Wiltord, international soccer player.
11 May – Benoît Magimel, actor.
14 May – Pierre-Yves André, soccer player.
24 May – Florence Baverel-Robert, biathlete.
28 May – Romain Duris, actor.
1 June – Jérôme Vareille, soccer player.
10 June – Christophe Bassons, cyclist.
13 June
Frédéric Bourdin, serial imposter.
Claire-Marie Le Guay, classical pianist.

July to September
7 July – Doc Gynéco, hip hop artist.
10 July – Nassim Akrour, soccer player.
13 July – Ronan Le Crom, soccer player.
21 July – Frédéric Biancalani, soccer player.
22 July - Pierrick Boyer, pastry chef.
4 August
Jean-Christophe Rouvière, soccer player.
Thierry Thulliez, jockey.
5 August – Antoine Sibierski, soccer player.
7 August – Yohann Bernard, swimmer.
9 August – Raphaël Poirée, biathlete.
11 August – Audrey Mestre, free-diver (died 2002).
26 August – Sébastien Bruno, rugby union player.
3 September – Didier André, motor racing driver.
4 September – Jean-Pierre Simb, soccer player.
12 September – Caroline Aigle, first woman fighter pilot in the French Air Force (died 2007).
16 September – Frédéric Da Rocha, soccer player.
25 September – Olivier Dacourt, soccer player.
28 September – Frédéric Danjou, soccer player.
September – Justine Lévy, author.

October to December
7 October – Hervé Alicarte, soccer player.
19 October – Laurent Brancowitz, guitarist.
21 October – Olivier Azam, rugby union player.
1 November – Renan Lavigne, squash player.
4 November – Jérôme Leroy, soccer player.
11 November – Bettina Goislard, United Nations worker (died 2003).
20 November – Alain Andji, pole vaulter.
27 November – Yann Le Pennec, slalom canoer.
28 November – Pascal Bedrossian, soccer player.
29 November – Cyril Dessel, cyclist.
30 November – Arnaud Vincent, motorcycle road racer.
6 December
Stéphane Augé, cyclist.
Delphine Combe, athlete.
9 December – Emmanuel Thibault, dancer.
11 December – Julien Robert, biathlete.
13 December – Richard Dourthe, rugby union player.
17 December – Yannick Fischer, soccer player.
22 December – Éric Despezelle, judoka.

Full date unknown
Thierry Bernard-Gotteland, French artist.
Amelie Chabannes, painter and sculptor.
Stéphane Michon, nordic combined skier.

Deaths

January to June
21 January – Arnaud Denjoy, mathematician (born 1884).
30 January – Fernand Arnout, weightlifter and Olympic medallist (born 1899).
13 March – Henri Pequet, pilot, flew first official airmail flight in 1911 (born 1888).
28 March – Françoise Rosay, actress (born 1891).
2 April – Georges Pompidou, President of France (born 1911).
9 April – Pierre Petiteau, rugby union player (born 1899).
18 April – Marcel Pagnol, novelist, playwright, and filmmaker (born 1895).
20 May – Jean Daniélou, theologian and historian (born 1905).
25 May – Robert Levasseur, rugby union player (born 1898).
7 June – Émilie Charmy, artist (born 1878).
12 June – André Marie, politician and Prime Minister of France (born 1897).
17 June – Pauline Carton, actress (born 1884).
19 June – Jean Wahl, philosopher (born 1888).
22 June
Darius Milhaud, composer (born 1892).
Alain Saint-Ogan, comics author and artist (born 1895).
Gaston Thubé, sailor and Olympic gold medallist (born 1876).

July to December
9 July – Georges Ribemont-Dessaignes, writer and artist (born 1884).
August – André Edouard Marty, artist (born 1882).
4 September – Marcel Achard, playwright, screenwriter and author (born 1899).
17 September – André Dunoyer de Segonzac, painter and graphic artist (born 1884).
17 October – Jean Vaysse, rugby union player (born 1900).
22 November – Gilbert Degrémont, water treatment expert (born 1908).
20 December – André Jolivet, composer (born 1905).
21 December – Félix Amiot, aircraft constructor (born 1894).
26 December – Armand Marcelle, rower and Olympic medallist (born 1905).

Full date unknown
Michel Alaux, fencing master and Olympic gold medallist (born 1924).
Roger Giroux, poet (born 1925).
René de Possel, mathematician (born 1905).

See also
 List of French films of 1974

References

1970s in France